Guy of Ibelin (1286–1308), Lord of Nicosia, was the son of Balian of Ibelin, seneschal of the kingdom of Cyprus, and of Alice of Lampron.

In 1303, with papal dispensation, he married his cousin Isabella of Ibelin, daughter of  Baldwin of Ibelin and of Marguerite de Giblet.  Their only child was Alix of Ibelin, second wife of Hugh IV of Cyprus.

Guy was buried on September 8, 1308 in the Premonstratensian Abbey of Bellapais near Kyrenia, Cyprus.

Notes

References

External links 
 Genealogical website for European royalty
 

1286 births
1308 deaths
House of Ibelin